The Netherlands cricket team toured Kenya in 2010. They played two One Day Internationals and an Intercontinental Cup match against Kenya.

Squads

Intercontinental Cup Match

ODI series

1st ODI

2nd ODI

Twenty20

World Twenty20 Qualifier
In addition to the Dutch team touring Kenya, the two were also drawn in the same opening group of the 2010 ICC World Twenty20 Qualifier played in the United Arab Emirates.

External links 
 Tour home at ESPNcricinfo

Netherlands 2009-10
2010 in cricket
2010 in Kenyan cricket